Goran Milošević (Serbian Cyrillic: Горан Милошевић; born 9 July 1972) is a Serbian former professional footballer who played as a centre-back.

Honours
Železnik
 Serbia and Montenegro Cup: 2004–05

External links
 
 

Association football defenders
Expatriate footballers in Spain
FK Bežanija players
FK Vojvodina players
FK Voždovac players
FK Železnik players
FK Zemun players
La Liga players
RCD Espanyol footballers
Real Jaén footballers
Segunda División players
Serbia and Montenegro expatriate footballers
Serbia and Montenegro footballers
Serbia and Montenegro expatriate sportspeople in Spain
Serbian footballers
Serbian SuperLiga players
UE Lleida players
1972 births
Living people
People from Zemun
Footballers from Belgrade